Bear Creek is a  long 2nd order tributary to the Fisher River in Surry County, North Carolina.

Course
Bear Creek rises in a pond about 2 north-northeast of Little Richmond, North Carolina.  Bear Creek then flows southeast to join the Fisher River about 1 mile southwest of Stony Knoll.

Watershed
Bear Creek drains  of area, receives about 48.5 in/year of precipitation, has a wetness index of 361.72, and is about 43% forested.

See also
List of rivers of North Carolina

References

Rivers of North Carolina
Rivers of Surry County, North Carolina